Gagliano Aterno is a town and comune approximately  from Aquila in the Abruzzo region of Italy. It is located in the vicinity of an ancient pre-Roman settlement, although most of the buildings in the village are from the medieval period.

Sights
 Castello di Gagliano Aterno, constructed in the 14th century.
 Church of Saint Martin
 Church of Santa Chiara, which has noteworthy stucco decorations from the Baroque period.

Notes and references

External links 
  Cultural Association of the village (in Italian)
 The Gagliano Aterno Club, Detroit, USA